Stigmella xuthomitra is a moth of the family Nepticulidae. It was described by Edward Meyrick in 1921. It is found in South Africa.

References

Endemic moths of South Africa
Nepticulidae
Moths of Africa
Moths described in 1921